Zach Kleiman (born 1988) is an American basketball executive who is the general manager and executive vice president of basketball operations for the Memphis Grizzlies of the National Basketball Association (NBA).

In 2022, Kleiman won the NBA Executive of the Year Award, having finished 6th place in voting for the award in 2020.

Early life and career
Kleiman, born in 1988 to a Jewish family, was raised in the Lincoln Park neighborhood of Chicago as a Chicago Bulls fan.

Kleiman attended the University of Southern California majoring in psychology from 2006 to 2010. During this time, he served as a public relations intern for the Los Angeles Lakers.

In 2013, Kleiman earned his J.D. from Duke University School of Law.

During the 2012-13 season, Kleiman was a basketball operations intern for the Charlotte Bobcats under general manager Rich Cho.

Executive Career
In 2015, Kleiman was an associate at Proskauer Rose when he accepted a position as team counsel of the Memphis Grizzlies.

Kleiman was promoted to Senior Director of Basketball Operations before the 2017-18 season.

Before the 2018–19 season, Kleiman was promoted to assistant general manager under general manager Chris Wallace.

Kleiman was named the executive vice president of basketball operations for the Memphis Grizzlies on April 11, 2019. This change in organizational structure makes Kleiman the Grizzlies's primary decision-maker in the front office. Immediately, Kleiman made seven trades, including Mike Conley to Utah and Andre Iguodala to Miami to rebuild the roster, collect draft picks and free up cap space. Kleiman emphasized that the team is "not going to be sacrificing the long-term future for short-term gains." After the 2019–20 season Kleiman finished in sixth place for the Executive of the Year Award.

In December 2020, Kleiman said "We have this group now that we think is genuinely special (and) it's on me, it's on us to continue to grow this group, to continue to build...The North Star continues to be competing to win championships over time."

In a 2021 post-NBA trade deadline news conference, Kleiman applauded the improvement of Ja Morant during his second season in the league. Kleiman said, "One thing I would definitely call out is Ja Morant’s growth as a leader...Something that oftentimes gets overlooked in the NBA is just accountability. I think Ja’s self-accountability and self-awareness, calling himself out—‘I need to be better tonight’—Ja sees that and holds himself accountable to such a high standard. That's a winning mentality." Kleiman also shared that Jaren Jackson Jr. would be available to play before May 2021, and the team "can't wait to have him back out there".

In June 2021, Kleiman was signed to a long-term extension. Owner Robert Pera said "Zach has proven to be a strong cultural leader in this organization, consistently demonstrating high-integrity, hard-work, humility and a drive for continuous improvement. We have confidence in our strategy and believe it will result in an elite organization over the long-term." After the 2021–22 season he was named Executive of the Year Award.

In the 2022 NBA offseason on draft night Kleiman already made 2 trades acquiring Danny Green and the 23rd pick in exchange for De'Anthony Melton.

References

1988 births
Living people
20th-century American businesspeople
American chief executives
Memphis Grizzlies executives
National Basketball Association executives